The Khoid, also Khoyd or Khoit ("Northern ones/people") people are an Oirat subgroup of the Choros clan. Once one of largest tribes of the Oirats.

References

Mongol peoples
Ethnic groups in Mongolia
Kalmykia
Kalmyk people
Oirats
Dzungar Khanate